Colla netrix is a moth in the Bombycidae family. It was described by Stoll in 1789. It can be identified by its foot pigmentation.

References

Natural History Museum Lepidoptera generic names catalog

Bombycidae
Moths described in 1789